Nizzo of Krems-Gars (or Rizzo, as he is sometimes called) was a scion of the house of Kuenring. Not much is known about this mysterious individual. What little is known is that he died before 1114 and married a woman named Truta. His father was the legendary Azzo of Gobatsburg.

Issue
Hadmar I of Kuenring, died childless on 27 May 1138
Albero II of Kuenring, died childless around 1163
Dietmar, born around 1098 and died around 1114, childless
Pelegrin of Zwettl, died around 1166, Priest of Zwettl Abbey

Year of birth unknown
Year of death uncertain
12th-century Austrian people
Austrian nobility